John Williams (30 October 1766 – after 1810) was elected as a Tory Member of Parliament (MP) for Windsor at the general election in July 1802. However, on 16 February 1804, his election was declared void after an election petition.

References

1766 births
Year of death missing
Members of the Parliament of the United Kingdom for constituencies in Berkshire
Tory MPs (pre-1834)
UK MPs 1802–1806